The 1964–65 European Cup, the 10th season of the football club tournament, was won by Internazionale for the second time in row, in a final match against two-time former champions Benfica, making it three consecutive titles for Italy (Milan had won it in 1962–63).

Iceland entered its champion for the first time this season, while Cyprus did not enter this time around.

Preliminary round

|}

1 Rangers won a play-off 3–1.

2 Anderlecht won a coin toss after their play-off match ended 0–0.

3 Dukla Prague won a coin toss after their play-off match ended 0–0.

Note: Starting the previous year tournament, only the title holder, Internazionale, joined directly in the first round.

First leg

Second leg

Dinamo București won 7–0 on aggregate.

5–5 on aggregate.

Rangers won 3–1 in a play-off.

Rapid Vienna won 5–0 on aggregate.

Panathinaikos won 5–4 on aggregate.

Köln won 2–0 on aggregate.

2–2 on aggregate.

0–0 in play-off; Anderlecht won coin toss.

Liverpool won 11–1 on aggregate.

Vasas ETO Győr won 6–2 on aggregate.

Lokomotiv Sofia won 8–5 on aggregate.

DWS won 4–1 on aggregate.

Lyn won 4–2 on aggregate.

Real Madrid won 9–2 on aggregate.

4–4 on aggregate.

0–0 in play-off; Dukla Prague won coin toss.

La Chaux-de-Fonds won 4–3 on aggregate.

Benfica won 10–2 on aggregate.

Bracket

First round

|}

First leg

Second leg

Köln won 3–2 on aggregate.

Liverpool won 4–0 on aggregate.

Internazionale won 7–0 on aggregate.

Rangers won 3–0 on aggregate.

DWS won 8–1 on aggregate.

Vasas ETO Győr won 8–7 on aggregate.

Benfica won 6–1 on aggregate.

Real Madrid won 6–2 on aggregate.

Quarter-finals

|}

1 Liverpool advanced to the semi-finals by winning a coin toss after their play-off match ended 2–2.

First leg

Second leg

2–2 on aggregate; Liverpool won coin toss.

Internazionale won 3–2 on aggregate.

Vasas ETO Győr won 2–1 on aggregate.

Benfica won 6–3 on aggregate.

Semi-finals

|}

First leg

Second leg

Internazionale won 4–3 on aggregate.

Benfica won 5–0 on aggregate.

Final

Top scorers
The top scorers from the 1964–65 European Cup (including preliminary round) are as follows:

References

External links
1964–64 All matches – season at UEFA website
 European Cup results at Rec.Sport.Soccer Statistics Foundation
 All scorers 1964–65 European Cup (excluding preliminary round) according to protocols UEFA 
 1964-65 European Cup – results and line-ups (archive)
 website Football Archive 1964–65 European Cup

1964–65 in European football
European Champion Clubs' Cup seasons